The Tulip Rally (Dutch: Tulpenrallye), first held in 1949, is the oldest Dutch rally competition.

The teams are divided into three classes: Tour, Sport and Expert. The Expert Class is for the navigators which in the past 2–6 years in the Top-20 of the Sport class have ended, or the previous years in the Top-20 of the Expert Class finished or in the Top-5 of the Sport Class. The Class Tour teams ride with little or no experience.

Participating cars must have been built before December 31, 1971. They are Class C, D, E, F or G divided depending on their age. If there are not more than three cars in one of these classes, the class is merged with the next class. In 2007 there were 43 teams in the Expert class with, 140 in the Sporting / Expert Class, 93 in the Sporting Class and 42 in the Touring Class.

According to the current event rules, it is not allowed to use a mobile phone unless you have bad luck (such as a breakdown). Modern stopwatches and watches are allowed. It is allowed to have up to 10 liters extra fuel in your trunk. Violations of the maximum speed is punished with penalty seconds.

Though organized in the Netherlands, most of the 2 500 kilometer route is run outside its organizing country, and the start itself is given from abroad. For instance, the 2019 competition starts from Andorra and most of the rallye goes through France and Belgium.

Winners

Historic Tulip Rally

Tulip Rally

External links
 Official website

Rally competitions in the Netherlands
Recurring sporting events established in 1949
1949 establishments in the Netherlands